Pin Oak I is a public art work by artist John Raymond Henry located at the Lynden Sculpture Garden near Milwaukee, Wisconsin. The sculpture is an abstract form made of aluminum bars painted safety yellow; it has been installed on the lawn.

References

Outdoor sculptures in Milwaukee
1976 sculptures
Abstract sculptures in Wisconsin
1976 establishments in Wisconsin
Aluminum sculptures in Wisconsin